Robert David Damewood (June 7, 1940 – June 28, 2009) was an American football coach.  He was the fourth head football coach  at Azusa Pacific College—now known as Azusa Pacific University—in Azusa, California, serving for two seasons, from 1970 to 1971, and compiling a record of 7–10.

Damewood died on June 28, 2009 of a stroke.

References

1940 births
2009 deaths
Azusa Pacific Cougars football coaches
Sportspeople from Los Angeles
Coaches of American football from California